The United States women's under-19 cricket team represents the United States in international under-19 women's cricket. The team is administrated by USA Cricket (UC).

The United States qualified for the inaugural ICC Under-19 Women's T20 World Cup automatically as they were the only ICC Associate member in the Americas region that met the Event Pathway Participation Criteria for the tournament. The side finished bottom of their group at the inaugural tournament.

History
The inaugural Women's Under-19 World Cup was scheduled to take place in January 2021, but was postponed multiple times due to the COVID-19 pandemic. The tournament was eventually scheduled to take place in 2023, in South Africa. As they were the only ICC Associate member in the Americas region that met the Event Pathway Participation Criteria, the United States qualified automatically for the tournament. 

The United States played their first series in August 2022, against the West Indies, winning the series 4–1. They announced their squad for the 2023 World Cup on 14 December 2022, with Shivnarine Chanderpaul announced as Head Coach of the side. The side finished bottom of the initial group stage at the tournament, and lost a subsequent play-off against Scotland.

Recent call-ups
The table below lists all the players who have been selected in recent squads for United States under-19s. This includes their squads for their series against the West Indies, and for the 2023 ICC Under-19 Women's T20 World Cup.

Records & statistics
International match summary

As of 20 January 2023

Youth Women's Twenty20 record versus other nations

As of 20 January 2023

Leading runs scorers

Leading wickets takers

Highest individual innings

Highest individual bowling figures

Highest team totals

Lowest team totals

Under-19 World Cup record

References

Women's Under-19 cricket teams
C
United States in international cricket